Stockleigh English is a village and civil parish in Devon, England. It has a 15th-century church, Saint Mary the Virgin, which was restored 1878–83.

Stockleigh Court in the parish is a grade II listed building which was the home of the Bellew family who lived at Stockleigh Court from the 16th to 20th century.

References

Villages in Mid Devon District